Ian Johnston Rhind Aitchison (born 1936) is a physicist and retired academic who was Professor of Physics at the University of Oxford between 1996 and 2003.

Career 
Born in 1936, Aitchison read mathematics at Peterhouse, Cambridge, graduating with a BA in 1958; he then completed a PhD in theoretical physics there in 1961.

Between 1961 and 1963, Aitchison was a research associate at Brookhaven National Laboratory in New York; after a year at the Saclay Nuclear Research Centre in France, he worked as a research associate at the Cavendish Laboratory at the University of Cambridge from 1964 to 1966. In 1966, he was elected a fellow of Worcester College, Oxford, and appointed a university lecturer in theoretical physics; he was awarded the title of Professor of Physics in 1996 and retired in 2003. He remains an emeritus professor at the University of Oxford.

Bibliography 

 Relativistic Quantum Mechanics (Macmillan, 1972).
 (Co-editor with Jack E. Paton) Rudolf Peierls and Theoretical Physics: Proceedings of the symposium held in Oxford on July 11th & 12th, 1974, to mark the occasion of the retirement of Professor Sir Rudolph E. Peierls, F.R.S., C.B.E. (Pergamon Press, 1977).  hbk.
 (Co-authored with A. J. G. Hey) Gauge Theories in Particle Physics (1st ed. Hilger and University of Sussex Press, 1982; 2nd ed. 1989; 3rd ed. Taylor and Francis, 2002; 4th ed., vols. 1 & 2 CRC Press, 2012).
 An Informal Introduction to Gauge Field Theories (Cambridge University Press, 1982).
 (Co-editor with C. H. Llewellyn Smith and J. E. Paton) Plots, Quarks and Strange Particles: Proceedings of the Dalitz Conference 1990 (World Scientific, 1991).
 Supersymmetry in Particle Physics: An Elementary Introduction (Cambridge University Press, 2007).

References 

Living people
1936 births
Theoretical physicists
Alumni of Peterhouse, Cambridge
Fellows of Worcester College, Oxford
Academics of the University of Oxford